Frank House, also known as The Newby House, is a historic home located at Maryville, Nodaway County, Missouri. It was built about 1890, and is a two-story, Italianate style asymmetrical frame dwelling.  It measures approximately 45 feet long and 38 feet wide.  It features a full-width front porch with carpenter trim columns and decorative scrollwork on the gable ends.  Also on the property is a contributing outbuilding.

It was listed on the National Register of Historic Places in 1983.

References

Houses on the National Register of Historic Places in Missouri
Italianate architecture in Missouri
Houses completed in 1890
Buildings and structures in Nodaway County, Missouri
National Register of Historic Places in Nodaway County, Missouri